Petah Tikva, also known as Em HaMoshavot, is a city in the Central District of Israel,  east of Tel Aviv. It was founded in 1878, mainly by Haredi Jews of the Old Yishuv, and became a permanent settlement in 1883 with the financial help of Baron Edmond de Rothschild.

Its jurisdiction covers 35,868 dunams (~35.9 km2 or 15 sq mi). Petah Tikva is part of the Tel Aviv Metropolitan Area.

Etymology
Petah Tikva takes its name (meaning "Door of Hope") from the biblical allusion in Hosea 2:15: "... and make the valley of Achor a door of hope." The Achor Valley, near Jericho, was the original proposed location for the town. The city and its inhabitants are sometimes known by the nickname "Mlabes" after the Arab village preceding the town. (See "Ottoman era" under "History" below.)

History

Tell Mulabbis, an archaeological mound in modern Petah Tikva, is an important archaeological site from the Yarkon River basin, with habitation remains from the Roman, Byzantine, Early Islamic, Crusader, Mamluk and Late Ottoman periods. The place was inhabited sporadically, and was known in Arabic as Mulabbis.

Crusader and Mamluk periods
Khirbat Mulabbis is believed to have been built on the site of the Crusader village of Bulbus, an identification proposed in the nineteenth century by French scholar fr. A Crusader source from 1133 CE states that the Count of Jaffa granted the land to the Hospitaller order, including “the mills of the three bridges” (“des moulins des trios ponts”).

In 1478 CE (AH 883), the Mamluk Sultan of Egypt, Qaitbay, endowed a quarter of the  revenues of Mulabbis to two newly established institutions: Madrasa Al-Ashrafiyya in Jerusalem, and a mosque in Gaza.

Ottoman period

Mulabbis
It has been suggested that Mulabbis was "Milus", a village with 42 Muslim households, mentioned in the Ottoman tax records in 1596.

The village appeared under the name of "Melebbes" on Jacotin's map drawn up during Napoleon's invasion in 1799, and shows up as "el Mulebbis" on Kiepert's map of Palestine, published in 1856. Following the invasion of the Levant by Ibrahim Pasha of Egypt (1831-1841), the village was repopulated by Egyptian emigrants belonging to the Abu Hamed al-Masri clan, as part of a wider wave of migration that settled in Palestine's coastal lowlands.

In 1870, Victor Guérin noted that "Melebbes" was a small village with 140 inhabitants, surrounded by fields of watermelon and tobacco. An Ottoman village list from about the same year showed that "Mulebbes" had 43  houses and a population of 125, though the population count included men only. It was also noted that the village was located on a hill, ("Auf einer Anhöhe"), 2 3/4 hours northeast of Jaffa.

The Palestine Exploration Fund's Survey of Western Palestine visited "Mulebbis" in 1874 and  described it as "a similar mud village [as Al-Mirr], with a well." Following the sale of Mulabbis' lands to Jewish entrepreneurs, its residents dispersed in neighboring villages like Jaljulia and Fajja.

Petah Tikva

Petah Tikva was founded in 1878 by Haredi Jewish pioneers from Europe, among them Yehoshua Stampfer, Moshe Shmuel Raab, Yoel Moshe Salomon, Zerach Barnett, and David Gutmann, as well as Lithuanian Rabbi Aryeh Leib Frumkin who built the first house. It was the first modern Jewish agricultural settlement in Ottoman Southern Syria (hence its nickname as "Mother of the Moshavot"). 

Originally intending to establish a new settlement in the Achor Valley, near Jericho, the pioneers purchased land in that area. However, Abdülhamid II cancelled the purchase and forbade them from settling there, but they retained the name Petah Tikva as a symbol of their aspirations.

In 1878 the founders of Petah Tikva learned of the availability of land northeast of Jaffa near the village of Mulabes (or Umlabes). The land was owned by two Christian businessmen from Jaffa, Antoine Bishara Tayan and Selim Qassar, and was worked by some thirty tenant farmers. Tayan's property was the larger, some 8,500 dunams, but much of it was in the malarial swamp of the Yarkon Valley. Qassar's property, approximately 3,500 dunams, lay a few kilometers to the south of the Yarkon, away from the swampland. It was Qassar's that was purchased on July 30, 1878. Tayan's holdings were purchased when a second group of settlers, known as the Yarkonim, arrived in Petah Tikva  the following year. Ottoman Sultan Abdul Hamid II allowed the purchase because of the poor quality of the land.

A malaria epidemic broke out in 1880, forcing the abandonment of the settlements on both holdings. Those who remained in the area moved south to Yehud. After Petah Tikva was reoccupied by Bilu immigrants in 1883 some of the original families returned. With funding for swamp drainage provided by Baron Edmond de Rothschild, the colony became more stable.

Upon learning that the Austrian post office in Jaffa wanted to open a branch in Petah Tikva,  Yitzchak Goldenhirsch, an early resident, offered his assistance on condition that the Austrian consulate issued a Hebrew stamp and a special postmark for Petah Tikva. The stamp was designed by an unknown artist featuring a plow, green fields and a blossoming orange tree. The price was 14 paras (a Turkish coin) and displayed the name 'Petah Tikva' in Hebrew letters.

David Ben Gurion (then known as David Grün) lived in Petah Tikva for a few months on his arrival in Palestine in 1906. It had a population of around 1000, half of them farmers. He found occasional work in the orange groves. But he soon caught malaria and his doctor recommended he return to Europe. The following year, after moving to Jaffa, he set up a Jewish workers organisation in Petah Tikva.

During the Sinai and Palestine Campaign of World War I, Petah Tikva served as a refugee town for residents of Tel Aviv and Jaffa, following their exile by the Ottoman authorities. The town suffered heavily as it lay between the Ottoman and British fronts during the war.

British Mandate era (1917–1948)

In the early 1920s, industry began to develop in the Petah Tikva region. In 1921, Petah Tikva was granted local council status by the British authorities. In May 1921 Petah Tikva was the target of an Arab attack, which left four of its Jewish inhabitants dead - an extension of the Jaffa riots of 1921. In 1927, Petah Tikva concluded a local peace treaty with the Arabs living nearby (see photo); subsequently, Petah Tikva was untouched by the 1929 Palestine riots. 

According to the 1922 census of Palestine conducted  by the British Mandate authorities, Petah Tikva had a total population of 3,032; 3,008 Jews, 22 Muslims and 2 Orthodox Christians. 

In the 1931 census the population had increased  to  6,880 inhabitants, in 1,688 houses. In 1937 it was recognized as a city. Its first mayor, Shlomo Stampfer, was the son of one of its founders, Yehoshua Stampfer.

Petah Tikva, a center of citrus farming, was considered by both the British government and the Jaffa Electric Company as a potentially important consumer of electricity for irrigation. The Auja Concession, which was granted to the Jaffa Electric Company on 1921, specifically referred to the relatively large Jewish settlement of Petah-Tikva. But it was only in late 1929 that the company submitted an irrigation scheme for Petah-Tikva, and it was yet to be approved by the government in 1930.

In 1931 Ben Gurion wrote that Petah Tikva had 5000 inhabitants and employed 3000 Arab labourers.

In the 1930s, the pioneering founders of Kibbutz Yavneh from the Religious Zionist movement immigrated to the British Mandate of Palestine, settling near Petah Tikva on land purchased by a Jewish-owned German company. Refining the agricultural skills they learned in Germany, these pioneers began in 1941 to build their kibbutz in its intended location in the south of Israel, operating from Petah Tikva as a base.

State of Israel (1948-)

1948 Arab–Israeli War and aftermath
After the 1948 Arab–Israeli War, Petah Tikva annexed all of the lands of the newly depopulated Palestinian village of Fajja.

Israeli–Palestinian conflict
The city has suffered a series of attacks in the 21st century as a result of the ongoing regional conflict. During the Second Intifada, Petah Tikva suffered three terrorist attacks: On May 27, 2002, a suicide bomber blew himself up at a small cafe outside a shopping mall, leaving two dead, including a baby; on December 25, 2003, a suicide bomber blew himself up at a bus stop near the Geha bridge, killing 4 civilians, and on February 5, 2006, a Palestinian got into a shuttle taxi, pulled out a knife, and began stabbing passengers killing two of them, but a worker from a nearby factory hit him with a log, subduing him.

Urban development

After the creation of the State of Israel in 1948, several adjoining villages – Amishav and Ein Ganim to the east (named after the biblical village (Joshua 15:34)), Kiryat Matalon to the west, towards Bnei Brak, Kfar Ganim and Mahaneh Yehuda to the south and Kfar Avraham on the north – were merged into the municipal boundaries of Petah Tikva, boosting its population to 22,000.

As of 2018, with a population of over 240,000 inhabitants, Petah Tikva is the third most populous city in the Tel Aviv Metropolitan Area ("Gush Dan").

Petah Tikva is divided into 33 neighborhoods for municipal purposes.

Economy

Petah Tikva is the second-largest industrial sector in Israel after the northern city of Haifa. The industry is divided into three zones—Kiryat Aryeh (named after Aryeh Shenkar, founder and first president of the Manufacturers Association of Israel and a pioneer in the Israeli textile industry), Kiryat Matalon (named after Moshe Yitzhak Matalon), and Segula, and includes textiles, metalwork, carpentry, plastics, processed foods, tires and other rubber products, and soap.

Numerous high-tech companies and start-ups have moved into the industrial zones of Petah Tikva, which now house the Israeli headquarters for the Oracle Corporation, IBM, Intel, Alcatel-Lucent, ECI Telecom, and GlaxoSmithKline Pharmaceuticals. The largest data center in Israel, operated by the company TripleC, is also located in Petah Tikva. Furthermore, the Israeli Teva company, the world's largest generic drug manufacturer, is headquartered in Petah Tikva. One of Israel's leading food processing corporations, Osem opened in Petah Tikva in 1976 and has since been joined by the company's administrative offices, distribution center and sauce factory. Strauss is also based in Petach Tikva.

Over time, the extensive citrus groves that once ringed Petah Tikva have disappeared as real-estate developers acquired the land for construction projects. Many new neighborhoods are going up in and around Petah Tikva. A quarry for building stone is located east of Petah Tikva.
As well as general hi-tech firms, Petah Tikva has developed a position as a base for many communications firms. As such, the headquarters of the Bezeq International international phone company is located in the Kiryat Matalon industrial zone as are those of the 012 Smile Internet Service Provider. The headquarters of Tadiran Telecom are in the Ramat Siv industrial zone. Arutz Sheva, the right wing Religious Zionist Israeli media network, operates an internet radio studio in Petah Tikva, where Arutz Sheva internet TV is located as well as the printing press for its B'Sheva newspaper.

The Israeli secret service, Shin Bet, has an interrogation facility in Petah Tikva.

Transportation

Petah Tikva is served by a large number of buses. A large number of intercity Egged buses stop there, and the city has a network of local buses operated by the Kavim company. The Dan bus company operates lines to Ramat Gan, Bnei Brak and Tel Aviv.

Petah Tikva's largest bus terminal is the Petah Tikva Central Bus Station (Tahana Merkazit), while other major stations are located near Beilinson Hospital and Beit Rivka. A rapid transit/light rail system is in the works that will connect Petah Tikva to Bnei Brak, Ramat Gan, Tel Aviv and Bat Yam.

Israel Railways maintains two suburban railroad stations in Segula and Kiryat Aryeh, in the northern part of the city. A central train station near the main bus station is envisioned as part of Israel Railways's long-term expansion plan. There are eight taxi fleets based in Petah Tikva, and the city is bordered by three of the major vehicle arteries in Israel: Geha Highway (Highway 4) on the west, the Trans-Samaria Highway (Highway 5) on the north, and the Trans-Israel Highway (Highway 6) on the east.

Light in construction, the bridge is built principally of steel with a glass-paved deck.

The Red Line of the Tel Aviv Light Rail system currently under construction will split into 2 branches upon entrance to Petah Tikva. One branch will travel to an underground terminal at the Kiryat Aryeh railway station, while the other will continue east to the Petach Tikva Central Bus Station. The Light Rail's train depot will also be located at Kiryat Aryeh. It is expected to be completed in 2022

Local government

Petah Tikva's history of government goes back to 1880, when the pioneers elected a council of seven members to run the new colony. From 1880 to 1921, members of the council were David Meir Guttman, Yehoshua Stampfer, Ze'ev Wolf Branda, Abraham Ze'ev Lipkis, Yitzhak Goldenhirsch, Chaim Cohen-Rice, Moshe Gissin, Shlomo Zalman Gissin and
Akiva Librecht. This governing body was declared a local council in 1921, and Petah Tikva became a city in 1937. Kadima, the political party founded by former Israeli prime minister Ariel Sharon, had its headquarters in Petah Tikva.

Council heads and mayors
Shlomo Zalman Gissin (1921)
Pinchas Meiri (1922–1928)
Shlomo Stampfer (1928–1937)
Shlomo Stampfer (1938–1940)
Yosef Sapir (1940–1950)
Mordechai Krausman (1951)
Pinchas Rashish (1951–1966)
Yisrael Feinberg (1966–1978)
Dov Tavori (1978–1989)
Giora Lev (1989–1999)
Yitzhak Ohayon (1999–2013)
Uri Ohad (2013)
Itzik Braverman (2013–2018)
Rami Greenberg (2018–)

Schools and religious institutions

Petah Tikva is home to 300 educational institutions from kindergarten through high school, catering to the secular, religious and Haredi populations. There are over 43,000 students enrolled in these schools, which are staffed by some 2,400 teachers.
In 2006, five schools participated in the nationwide Mofet program, which promotes academic excellence.
Petah Tikva has seventeen public libraries, the main one located in the city hall building.

Some 70,000 Orthodox Jews live in Petah Tikva. The community of Petah Tikva is served by 300 synagogues, including the 120-year-old Great Synagogue, eight mikvaot (ritual baths) and two major Haredi yeshivot, Lomzhe Yeshiva and Or-Yisrael (founded by the Chazon Ish, Rabbi Avraham Yeshayahu Karelitz). Yeshivat Hesder Petah Tikva, a Modern Orthodox Hesder Yeshiva affiliated with the Religious Zionist movement, directed by Rabbi Yuval Cherlow, is also located in Petah Tikva. Additionally, Rav Michael Laitman, PhD in Philosophy and Kabbalah (see Bnei Baruch), daily leads 200-300 students and hundreds of thousands virtually (some estimates of up to 2 million) in the method of Kabbalah learned from his teacher Rav Baruch Ashlag, known as the RABASH.

Petah Tikva has two cemeteries: Segula Cemetery, east of the city, and Yarkon Cemetery, to the northeast.

Health care

Six hospitals are located in the city. The Rabin Medical Center Beilinson complex includes the Beilinson Medical Center, the Davidoff Oncologic Center, the Geha Psychiatric Hospital, the Schneider Pediatric Hospital and Tel Aviv University's Faculty of Medical Research. Other medical facilities in Petah Tikva are HaSharon Hospital, the Beit Rivka Geriatric Center, the Kupat Holim Medical Research Center and a private hospital, Ramat Marpeh, affiliated with Assuta Hospital. The Schneider Pediatric Center is one of the largest and most modern children's hospitals in the Middle East. In addition, there are many family health clinics in Petah Tikva as well as Kupat Holim clinics operated by Israel's health maintenance organizations. The city is also served by Mayanei Hayeshua Medical Center, a Haredi hospital in nearby Bnei Brak.

Landmarks and cultural institutions

Petah Tikva's Independence Park includes a zoo at its northeastern edge, the Museum of Man and Nature, a memorial to the victims of the 1921 Arab riots, an archaeological display, Yad Labanim soldiers memorial, a local history museum, a Holocaust museum and the Petah Tikva Museum of Art.

Sports

The main stadium in Petah Tikva is the 11,500-seat HaMoshava Stadium. Petah Tikva has two football teams – Hapoel Petah Tikva and Maccabi Petah Tikva. The local baseball team, the Petach Tikva Pioneers, played in the inaugural 2007 season of the Israel Baseball League. The league folded the following year. In 2014, Hapoel Petah Tikva's women's football team recruited five Arab-Israeli women to play on the team. One of them is now a team captain.

Archaeology
In November–December 2006 and May 2007, a salvage excavation was conducted at Khirbat Mulabbis, east of Moshe Sneh Street in Petah Tikva on behalf of the Israel Antiquities Authority. Four main strata (I–IV) were identified, dating to the Byzantine period (fourth–seventh centuries CE; Stratum IV), Early Islamic period (eighth–tenth centuries CE; Stratum III), Crusader period (twelfth–thirteenth centuries CE; Stratum II) and Ottoman period (Stratum I).

Notable people

 Gila Almagor (born 1939), actress and author 
 Yehuda Amichai (1924–2000), poet
 Zvi Arad (1942–2018), mathematician, acting president of Bar-Ilan University, president of Netanya Academic College
 Hannah Barnett-Trager (1870–1943), wrote about early Petah Tikva
 Hanoch Bartov (1926-2016), author
 Apollo Braun (born 1976), artist, author, playwright
 Mor Bulis (born 1996), tennis player
 Tal Burstein (born 1980), basketball player
 Moran Buzovski (born 1992), Olympic rhythmic gymnast
 Shmuel Dayan (1891–1968), Zionist activist
 Israel Finkelstein (born 1949), archaeologist
 Dudu Fisher (born 1951), cantor and stage performer
 Gal Gadot (born 1985), actress and model
 Zehava Gal-On (born 1956), Meretz politician
 A. D. Gordon (1856–1922), Labor Zionist ideologue
 Tamar Gozansky (born 1940), politician
 Avraham Grant (born 1955), football coach
 Tzofit Grant (born 1964), television personality
 Tzachi Halevy (born 1975), film and television actor, singer
 Simcha Jacobovici (born 1953), filmmaker
 Doron Jamchi (born 1961), basketball player
 Nimrod Kamer (born 1981), poet and class warrior residing in London
 Yosef Karduner (born 1969), Hasidic singer-songwriter
 Haim Kaufman (1934–1995), Knesset member
 Yehoshua Kenaz (born 1937), novelist
 Itzik Kol (1932–2007), television and movie producer
 Alona Koshevatskiy (born 1997), Olympic rhythmic gymnast
 Amnon Krauz (born 1952), Olympic swimmer
 Peretz Lavie (born 1949), expert in the psychophysiology of sleep and sleep disorders, 16th president of the Technion - Israel Institute of Technology, Dean of the Rappaport Faculty of Medicine
 Karina Lykhvar (born 1998), Olympic rhythmic gymnast
 Menachem Magidor (born 1946), mathematician; President of the Hebrew University of Jerusalem
 Samir Naqqash (1938–2004), Iraqi-Jewish author
 Zvi Nishri (Orloff) (1878–1973), physical education pioneer
 Uri Orbach (1960–2015), The Jewish Home politician, journalist and writer
 Elyakum Ostashinski (1909–1983), first mayor of Rishon LeZion
 Leah Rabin (1928–2000), wife of Israeli prime minister Yitzhak Rabin
 Neta Rivkin (born 1991), rhythmic gymnast
 Pnina Rosenblum (born 1954), actress, fashion model, businesswoman and politician
 Michal Rozin (born 1969), Meretz politician
 Rami Saari (born 1963), poet, translator and linguist
 Dan Shechtman (born 1941), winner of Nobel Prize for Chemistry
 Sigal Shachmon (born 1971), model, actress and television presenter
 Giora Spiegel (born 1947), football player and coach
 Nahum Stelmach (1936–1999), football player
 Pnina Tamano-Shata (born 1981), politician

In popular culture
Petah Tikva is referenced in the Tony Award-winning 2016 musical The Band's Visit, as the main plot derives from a mix-up between the city and the fictional town of "Bet Hatikva" in the Negev Desert of southern Israel.

International relations

Petah Tikva is twinned with:

 Bacău, Romania
 Cherkasy, Ukraine
 Chernihiv, Ukraine
 Chicago, United States
 Las Condes, Chile
 Gabrovo, Bulgaria
 Gyumri, Armenia
 Kadıköy, Turkey
 Koblenz, Germany
 Międzyrzec Podlaski, Poland
 Șimleu Silvaniei, Romania
 Taichung, Taiwan
 Trondheim, Norway
 Norrköping, Sweden

See also
List of neighborhoods of Petah Tikva

References

Bibliography

 
  

  

  
 
 
 
 
 

  
 (p. 216)

External links
Survey of Western Palestine, Map 13: IAA,  Wikimedia commons

Municipality's official website 
Photos of Petah Tikva
Cadastral map of Petah Tiqva, Ein Ganim, Al Mirr, Mahne Yehuda, 1934 - Eran Laor Cartographic Collection, The National Library of Israel

 
Populated places established in 1878
Jewish villages in the Ottoman Empire
Cities in Central District (Israel)
1878 establishments in Ottoman Syria
1878 in Ottoman Syria